The 1995–96 Iran 2nd Division football season.

First round

Group 1

Group 2

References 

www.rsssf.com

League 2 (Iran) seasons
Iran
2